The 4th World Science Fiction Convention (Worldcon), also known as Pacificon I, was held on 4–7 July 1946 at the Park View Manor in Los Angeles, California, United States.

The convention chairman was Walter J. Daugherty.

This was the first time since 1941 that the otherwise annual event was held. The interruption was due to the Second World War.

Participants 

Attendance was approximately 130.

Guests of Honor 

 A. E. Van Vogt
 E. Mayne Hull

Awards

1946 Retro Hugo Awards 

Hugo Awards were not presented, as the first ones were awarded in 1953. However, in 1996 at the 54th World Science Fiction Convention held in Anaheim, a set of Retro Hugo Awards were presented to honor work that would have been Hugo-eligible had the award existed in 1951:

 Best Novel: The Mule by Isaac Asimov (Astounding, November/December 1945)
 Best Novella: Animal Farm by George Orwell (Secker & Warburg)
 Best Novelette: "First Contact" by Murray Leinster (Astounding, May 1945)
 Best Short Story: "Uncommon Sense" by Hal Clement (Astounding, September 1945)
 Best Dramatic Presentation: The Picture of Dorian Gray
 Best Professional Editor: John W. Campbell, Jr.
 Best Professional Artist: Virgil Finlay
 Best Fanzine: Voice of the Imagi-Nation, edited by Forrest J Ackerman
 Best Fan Writer: Forrest J Ackerman
 Best Fan Artist: William Rotsler

See also 

 Hugo Award
 Science fiction
 Speculative fiction
 World Science Fiction Society
 Worldcon

References 

1946 conferences
1946 in California
1946 in the United States
Science fiction conventions in the United States
Worldcon